Jenifer Solidade Almeida (born 13 June 1984) is a singer from Cape Verde.

Jenifer Solidade Almeida was born on 13 June 1984, in the town of Mindelo on the island of São Vicente, Cape Verde.

Solidade started her career as a backing singer for other musicians, including Tito Paris, Ildo Lobo, Nancy Vieira, and Mayra Andrade. She is a full member of the Cesaria Evora Orchestra. In 2013, she achieved wider recognition with her "highly distinctive" cover version of the song Hit the Road Jack, and its accompanying video.

In 2016, she appeared on a Lusafrica compilation album, Mornas De Cabo Verde with some of the finest morna performers in the country.

Her first solo album is Um Click (One Click), with the song Cuidôd Na Click (Be aware to click), where Solidade encourages listeners to be careful about what they publish on social media networks.

For the thirtieth Curraletes beach music festival, in Porto Novo, on the island of  Santo Antão, which ran from 18 to 20 August 2017, Solidade was one of the three headline acts, alongside Atim and Cordas de Sol.

References

Living people
1984 births
People from Mindelo
21st-century Cape Verdean women singers
Morna (music) singers
Singers from São Vicente, Cape Verde